Sanjmyataviin Purevsukh (born on 17 March 1973), is a Mongolian football coach. He had recently coach the Mongolian national team, for the 2018 FIFA World Cup qualification in Russia.

References

1973 births
Living people
Mongolia national football team managers
Mongolian football managers